Athletic Union of Zakaki is a Cypriot football club based in Zakaki, Limassol. The club was founded in 1956. Their colours are green and white and they play in Zakaki Municipal Stadium.

Chairman
The Chairman of AEZ Zakakiou, Stelios Christou, holds a unique record. He was one of the founders of the club in 1956, and he has been involved in the management of the club since 1957, and from 1986 leads the club as a chairman.

League History (from 2009 onwards)

Honours
 Cypriot Third Division: 2
1992–93, 1997–98

 Cypriot Fourth Division: 2
1986–87, 1991–92 (Limassol-Paphos Group)

References

External links
Official Website
CFA profile

 
Football clubs in Cyprus
1956 establishments in Cyprus
Association football clubs established in 1956